The Yala Swamp is a wetland region of about  in Western Kenya.

Location

The Yala Swamp at the mouth of the Yala River covers about  along the northeastern shore of Lake Victoria.
The wetland is in Siaya and Busia counties in Kenya. It acts as a filter for waters that flow into Lake Victoria from two major rivers, the Yala River and Nzoia River. 
It is sometimes considered the source of the Nile.

In the past the Yala River flowed through the eastern 20% of the Yala Swamp into Lake Kanyaboli, then into the main swamp, and then through a small gulf into Lake Victoria.
Today the eastern part of the swamp has been drained, and the river flows directly into the  main swamp.
It is cut off from Lake Kanyaboli by a silt-clay dyke.
Lake Kanyaboli now receives its water from the surrounding catchment area and from back-seepage from the swamp.
The river's gulf has been cut off from the lake by a culvert, which created the  Lake Sare through back-flooding.

Ecology

The swamps harbour endangered fish species Oreochromis esculentus and Oreochromis variabilis that have disappeared from Lake Victoria itself. The sitatunga antelope (Tragecephalus spekii) still lives in the swamps’ papyrus. BirdLife International classifies the Yala Swamp among Kenya’s 60 Important Bird Areas. Some of the birds that live there are the blue-breasted bee-eater, the papyrus gonolek, the swamp flycatcher, the papyrus canary, the white-winged swamp warbler and the Baillon's crake.

A 2005 report noted changes in Lake Sare that threatened the lake ecosystem through eutrophication and pollution.
It recommended an inclusive management plan for the Yala swamp complex to prevent further degradation of the ecosystem.
As of 2019 BirdLife International scored the threat to the swamp complex as high, and was pessimistic about action being taken.

References

Sources

External links 

Biodiversity and Sustainable Management of a Tropical Wetland Lake Ecosystem:A Case Study of Lake Kanyaboli, Kenya by Romulus Abila
more info at global response
a case study of the Yala swamp by  Romulus Abila of Maseno University Kenya

Wetlands of Kenya
Nature conservation in Kenya
Swamps of Africa